Pittosporum dasycaulon is a small tree up to 8 meters endemic to the Western Ghats of India.

References

External links
 Places where seen
 http://pilikula.com/botanical_list/botanical_name_p/pittosporum_dasycaulon.html

Flora of India (region)
dasycaulon